The Royal Welsh Show is organised by the Royal Welsh Agricultural Society, which was formed in 1904. It takes place in July of each year, at Llanelwedd, near Builth Wells, in Powys, Mid Wales.

The first show was held in Aberystwyth in 1904, and its success led to the development of the permanent showground at Llanelwedd, first used in 1963.

No show was held in 1915–18, 1940–45 nor 2020–21. The latter years saw some events going virtual.

Format 
The show lasts for four days and attracts more than 200,000 visitors annually, boosting tourism in Wales. 

Events include:
Judging of cattle, sheep, horses, goats, pigs and various other domestic animals
Sheepdog trials
Sheep shearing competitions
Horse riding competitions
Four-in-hand and Carriage Driving displays
Falconry
Games and sports such as the King's Troop, Royal Horse Artillery of the Royal Horse Artillery 
Arts and crafts show
Live music

Given its "Royal" status it is not unusual for a senior member of the British Royal family to attend at the Show. Charles III was a familiar sight as Prince of Wales. Following his support during the 2001 foot and mouth crisis, one farming union, the FUW, nominated him for his outstanding contribution to agriculture in 2003, which was announced at the show.

Business
Businesses with links to agriculture will have a trade stand at the show. It is an opportunity to attract new business from the farming community as well as to network with current customers.

Young Farmers
The Royal Welsh Show is also an event for young people who live in farming communities in Wales. The Wales Federation of Young Farmers' Clubs runs a series of competitions across Wales throughout the year, and the finals of the practical competitions usually take place at the Show. Amongst these events are stock judging and tractor driving.

Welsh Cob Senior Stallions class
The Welsh Cob Senior Stallion class is traditionally held on the Wednesday afternoon of the show ("Welsh Cob Wednesday"). The class is held using the entire main arena. The fifty-plus stallions are paraded at the trot in front of the grandstand before they settle down for the judging of the class.

Rail access
Linked via the Heart of Wales Line station of Builth Road, where connecting buses link with the Transport for Wales service during show times.

See also
List of Royal Shows
Royal Show former English agricultural show

External links

Official website

Welsh
Festivals in Wales
Builth Wells
Tourist attractions in Powys
Stadiums in Wales
1904 establishments in Wales
Festivals established in 1904
Summer events in Wales